The Libertarian Party of North Dakota is the North Dakota affiliate of the Libertarian Party. The state chair is Taylor Bakken.

Vote totals for Libertarian candidates in North Dakota

U.S. President

U.S. House

See also
 List of state Libertarian Parties in the United States

References

External links
 Libertarian Party of North Dakota

North Dakota
Political parties in North Dakota